Hemmatabad (also Romanized as Hemmatābād) is a village in Toghrol Al Jerd Rural District, Toghrol Al Jerd District, Kuhbanan County, Kerman Province, Iran. At the 2006 census, its population was 17, in 5 families.

References 

Populated places in Kuhbanan County